Mir Dostali railway station also known as Mir Dost Ali is  located in  Pakistan.

See also
 List of railway stations in Pakistan
 Pakistan Railways

References

External links

Railway stations in Kashmore District